Katei Saibansho-mae is a Hiroden station on the Hiroden Hakushima Line, located in Kami-hatchobori, Naka-ku, Hiroshima. The station is located in front of the Hiroshima Family Court, and is operated by the Hiroshima Electric Railway.

Routes
There is one route that serves Katei Saibansho-mae Station:
 Hakushima - Hatchobori Route

Station layout
The station consists of two side platforms serving two tracks. A crosswalk connects the platforms with the sidewalk. There is a small shelter located on the middle of each platform.

Adjacent stations

Surrounding area
 Hiroshima Family Court
 Hiroshima Detention Center

History
 Opened on June 10, 1952

See also

 Hiroden Streetcar Lines and Routes

References 

Katei Saibansho-mae Station
Railway stations in Japan opened in 1912